Piotr Artur Trochowski (born 22 March 1984) is a German former professional footballer who played as an attacking midfielder. According to his FIFA World Cup 2010 profile he is a playmaker known for "his speed, agility, tricky dribbling and refined technique."

Formed at Bayern Munich, he spent six-and-a-half seasons at Hamburger SV before transferring to Sevilla in 2011. Sevilla cancelled his contract in September 2014, after which he filed a lawsuit. In 2015, he signed for FC Augsburg on a one-year deal.

Trochowski made his full international debut for Germany in 2006, and earned 35 caps over four years. He was part of their squads which reached the UEFA Euro 2008 Final and the semi-finals of the 2010 FIFA World Cup.

Early life 
Trochowski was born in Tczew in Poland. The family, with father Wiesław and mother Alicja, left for Hamburg under the right of return when Piotr was five years old. All of his grandparents held German nationality for some period of time.

Club career

Early career
As a nine-year-old boy, Trochowski started his career with Billstedt Horn and then played for SC Concordia and FC St. Pauli, in Hamburg. In 1999, he got transferred to FC Bayern Munich, starting with its junior side then progressing to the amateur team. He made it also to Bayern's first team but was never a regular in this side, making only 13 appearances in the Bundesliga.

Hamburger SV
In January 2005, he moved back to Hamburg to play for Hamburger SV. Team manager Thomas Doll gave him a chance and Trochowski proved his worth. Within two seasons, he played himself into the starting line-up of the team, scoring five goals (including one [and an assist] against former team Bayern Munich, in a 24 September 2005 2–0 home win) in his first full season as Hamburg reached the UEFA Champions League.

Sevilla 
On 5 April 2011, Trochowski's agent Roman Grill confirmed that his client would move to Sevilla when his contract expired at the end of the season. He had been an irregular player for Hamburg during the second half of the season, making just two starts out of 11 possible Bundesliga matches after the winter break. In his first season with the club, he featured in 35 La Liga games, scoring one goal and providing two assists as Sevilla finished in a disappointing ninth place.

On 15 September 2012, he smashed in a half-volley after only 69 seconds, to hand his side a 1–0 victory over reigning La Liga champions Real Madrid.

In September 2014, Sevilla stated that the club and Trochowski terminated the contract by mutual consent, one year prior then contractually agreed. He disagreed, threatening a lawsuit against the club which was decided in his favor. Nevertheless, he was not included in Sevilla‘s squad throughout the season.

FC Augsburg 
On 16 July 2015, Trochowski joined Bundesliga club FC Augsburg for a short trial before signing a full contract with Augsburg until the end of the 2015–16 season five days later. Having made few appearances due to injuries, he was released by Augsburg at the end of the season.

Retirement
He later retired.

He returned to playing for about a year in 2020, scoring two goals in four appearances in the Oberliga Hamburg for the third team of Hamburger SV. He announced his retirement in July 2021.

International career 

Since Trochowski was born in Poland, he was eligible to play for Poland. His mother sent several letters to the Polish Football Association (PZPN), informing it about her talented son and about his willingness to cap for Poland. The PZPN, however, was not interested, which disappointed both Trochowski and his mother, and he chose to play for Germany. Trochowski said in response, "My heart is closer to Poland, but nobody there was interested in me, so I play for the Germans. There was no reply to my mother's letter, and the Germans were interested in me." He said this in an interview in August 2005. In the German daily Die Welt, however, Trochowski said that, "Even back then, I wanted to play for Germany, because here I enjoyed my schooling and gained my footballing skills."

Trochowski played for the German under-20 team at the 2003 FIFA World Youth Championship. One year after his move to Hamburg, senior national coach Joachim Löw called him for the first time, and he debuted on 7 October 2006 in a friendly against Georgia at the Ostseestadion in Rostock; he started the game and was replaced by Torsten Frings for the final 14 minutes of the 2–0 victory. After having appeared six times during the qualification matches, Trochowski was selected for the final 23-man squad for Euro 2008, but was unused as Germany reached the final. He scored his first international goal on 15 October 2008, the sole goal in a 2010 World Cup Qualifier against Wales in Mönchengladbach.

Personal life 
Piotr is part of a football family – his three brothers are all semi-professional players: Christoph (plays for SC V/W Billstedt), Sławomir (plays for Hamm United) and Arkadiusz (plays for TuS Hamburg).

His cousin Krystian is a German international rugby union player, playing for the Berliner RC in the Rugby-Bundesliga.

Career statistics

Club

International 
Scores and results list Germany's goal tally first, score column indicates score after each Trochowski goal.

Honours 
Bayern Munich
 Bundesliga: 2002–03
 DFB-Pokal: 2002–03
 DFB-Ligapokal: 2004

Hamburger SV
 UEFA Intertoto Cup: 2005, 2007

Sevilla
 UEFA Europa League: 2013–14

Germany
 FIFA World Cup third place: 2010
 UEFA European Championship runner-up: 2008

References

External links 

 
 
 2010 FIFA World Cup profile
 
 

1984 births
Living people
People from Tczew
Sportspeople from Pomeranian Voivodeship
Polish emigrants to Germany
Naturalized citizens of Germany
German people of Polish descent
German footballers
Association football midfielders
Germany youth international footballers
Germany under-21 international footballers
Germany international footballers
UEFA Euro 2008 players
2010 FIFA World Cup players
UEFA Europa League winning players
Bundesliga players
Regionalliga players
SC Concordia von 1907 players
FC St. Pauli players
FC Bayern Munich II players
FC Bayern Munich footballers
Hamburger SV players
La Liga players
Sevilla FC players
FC Augsburg players
German expatriate footballers
German expatriate sportspeople in Spain
Expatriate footballers in Spain